The School of Names, sometimes called the School of Forms and Names, was a school of Chinese philosophy that grew out of Mohism during the Warring States period in 479–221 BCE. The followers of the School of Names were sometimes called the Logicians or Disputers.

Overview
The philosophy of the Logicians is often considered to be akin to those of the sophists or of the dialecticians. Joseph Needham notes that their works have been lost, except for the partially preserved  Gongsun Longzi, and the paradoxes of Chapter 33 of the Zhuangzi. Needham considers the disappearance of the greater part of  Gongsun Longzi one of the worst losses in the ancient Chinese books, as what remains is said to reach the highest point of ancient Chinese philosophical writing.

One of the few surviving lines from the school, "a one-foot stick, every day take away half of it, in a myriad ages it will not be exhausted," resembles Zeno's paradoxes. However, some of their other aphorisms seem contradictory or unclear when taken out of context, for example, "Dogs are not hounds."

They were opposed by the Later Mohists for their paradoxes.

History
Warring States era philosophers Deng Xi, Yin Wen, Hui Shi, Gongsun Long were all associated with the School of Names.

A contemporary of Confucius, Deng Xi (died 501 BC) is associated with litigation. He is said to have argued for the permissibility of contradictory propositions, likely engaging in hair-splitting debates on the interpretation of laws, legal principles and definitions. Deng is reported to have drawn up a code of penal laws and is cited by Liu Xiang for the origin of the Shen Buhai's principle of Xing-Ming, comparing minister's performances with their job titles.

Shen Buhai
In the Han Dynasty secretaries of government who had charge of the records of decisions in criminal matters were called Xing-Ming. The earliest literary occurrence for Xing-Ming, in the Zhan Guo Ce, is in reference to the school of names, although Han dynasty Sima Qian (145 or 135 – 86 BC) and Liu Xiang (77–6 BC) attribute it to the "Chinese Legalist" doctrine of Shen Buhai (400 – c. 337 BC) Shen actually used the older, more philosophically common equivalent, ming-shi, or name and reality, linking the "Legalist doctrine of names" with the debates of the school of names. Such discussions are also prominent in the Han Feizi.

Ming ("name") sometimes has the sense of speech – so as to compare the statements of an aspiring officer with the reality of his actions – or reputation, again compared with real conduct (xing "form" or shi "reality"). Two anecdotes by Han Fei provide examples: The Logician Ni Yue argued that a white horse is not a horse, and defeated all debaters, but was still tolled at the gate. In another, the chief minister of Yan pretended to see a white horse dash out the gate. All of his subordinates denied having seen anything, save one, who ran out after it and returned claiming to have seen it, and was thereby identified as a flatterer.

Shen Buhai's personnel control, or rectification of names (such as titles) worked thereby for "strict performance control" (Hansen) correlating claims, performances and posts.<ref name="auto"></re</ref> It would become a central tenet of both Legalist statecraft and its Huang-Lao derivatives. Rather than having to look for "good" men, ming-shi or xing-ming can seek the right man for a particular post, though doing so implies a total organizational knowledge of the regime. More simply though, it can allow ministers to "name" themselves through accounts of specific cost and time frame, leaving their definition to competing ministers. Claims or utterances "bind the speaker to the realization a job (Makeham)." This was the doctrine, with subtle differences, favoured by Han Fei. Favoring exactness, it combats the tendency to promise too much. The correct articulation of Ming is considered crucial to the realization of projects.

See also 

 History of logic
 Mozi

References

Citations

Sources

Bibliography 
 Ian Johnston; Wang Ping, The Mingjia and Related Texts: Bilingual edition, Hong Kong, Chinese University of Hong Kong Press, 2019.

External links
 

 
History of logic
Mohism
Schools and traditions in ancient Chinese philosophy